Knight Bachelor is the oldest and lowest-ranking form of knighthood in the British honours system; it is the rank granted to a man who has been knighted by the monarch but not inducted as a member of one of the organised orders of chivalry. Women are not knighted; in practice, the equivalent award for a woman is appointment as Dame Commander of the Order of the British Empire (founded in 1917).

Knights Bachelor appointed in 1917

Notes 
It was announced in the 1917 New Year Honours that a knighthood was to be bestowed on William Gundry, JP (a magistrate for Middlesex, the president of the Enfield Liberal Association and a director of Messrs Morris, Ashby Ltd, a firm of city merchants), but he died before he received the accolade. By a royal warrant dated 9 January 1918, George V declared that his widow,  Florence Eugenie Barwell Gundry, "shall have, hold and enjoy the style, title, place and precedence to which she would have been entitled had her husband survived to receive the honour of Knight Bachelor at the hands of His Majesty".

References 

Knights Bachelor
Lists of knights and dames
British honours system